Acleris minuta, the yellow-headed fireworm or lesser apple leaf-folder, is a species of moth of the family Tortricidae. It is found in eastern North America.

The length of the forewings is 6.5–9.5 mm. The forewings are uniform yellow or orange (the summer form) or grey (the overwintering form). Adults are on wing in up to three generations per year and have been recorded on wing from June to August and in October.

The larvae feed on Myrica gale, Calluna, Kalmia (including Kalmia angustifolia), Vaccinium (including Vaccinium macrocarpon), Malus (including Malus pumila), Prunus, Pyrus and Salix species. Young larvae feed on the underside of the leaves of their host plant, while older larvae web together leaves or fold single leaves. Full-grown larvae are greenish yellow and reach a length of about 12 mm. The species overwinters as a third-generation adult.

References

Moths described in 1869
minuta
Moths of North America